Hiri Hiri (born 1 May 1995) is a Papua New Guinean cricketer. He has represented Papua New Guinea at youth level in the 2014 Under-19 Cricket World Cup and at senior level in both One Day International and Twenty20 International cricket.

Youth cricket
Hiri played for Papua New Guinea under-19s in the 2014 Under-19 Cricket World Cup. He played six matches and scored 87 runs at an average of 14.50.

International cricket
He made his List A debut in the 2015–17 ICC World Cricket League Championship on 18 November 2015 against Nepal. He made his Twenty20 International debut on 6 February 2016 against Ireland in Australia. He made his One Day International debut on 4 November 2016 against Hong Kong. He was in Papua New Guinea's squad for the last ever World Cricket League tournament, the 2019 ICC World Cricket League Division Two tournament in Namibia.

In June 2019, he was selected to represent the Papua New Guinea cricket team in the men's tournament at the 2019 Pacific Games.

Hiri returned to Papua New Guinea's national squad in the 2019 Scotland Tri-Nation Series, the first tri-series of the 2019–22 ICC Cricket World Cup League 2 tournament. He only played in Papua New Guinea's final match against Oman. He scored 31 not out batting at number nine, his highest ODI score, and one of only two players in Papua New Guinea's team to reach 30 in a four-wicket loss.

In September 2019, he was named in Papua New Guinea's squad for the 2019 ICC T20 World Cup Qualifier tournament in the United Arab Emirates. In August 2021, Hiri was named in Papua New Guinea's squad for the 2021 ICC Men's T20 World Cup.

References

External links
 

1995 births
Living people
Papua New Guinean cricketers
Papua New Guinea One Day International cricketers
Papua New Guinea Twenty20 International cricketers
Place of birth missing (living people)